Phyllodon is a genus of moss.

References

Hypnaceae
Moss genera